Bradfield is a village and civil parish in Essex, England. The village is in the district of Tendring and the parliamentary constituency of North Essex. There is a Parish Council. 
The 2001 National Census recorded a population of 1,094, rising to 1,112 at the 2011 Census.

The Anglican church is dedicated to Saint Lawrence. One of the windows commemorates Edwin Harris Dunning, the first pilot to land an aircraft on a moving ship, as does another memorial within the north transept. His grave lies in the churchyard.

The village is close to the River Stour.

Bradfield is home to Bradfield Primary School.

Governance
Bradfield is part of the electoral ward called Bradfield, Wrabness and Wix. The population of this ward at the 2011 Census was 2,223.

References

External links 

Villages in Essex
Civil parishes in Essex
Tendring